Nicolas Poussin (1594-1665) was a French painter.

Poussin may also refer to:
Poussin (chicken)

People with the surname
Gérald Poussin (born 1946), Swiss artist
Gaspard Poussin (1615-1675), name sometimes given to the painter Gaspard Dughet, pupil and brother-in-law of Nicolas Poussin

See also
Charles Jean de la Vallée-Poussin (1866-1962), Belgian mathematician
Charles-Louis-Joseph-Xavier de la Vallée-Poussin (1827–1903), Belgian geologist and mineralogist, father of Charles Jean
Théodore Poussin, a comic book series

French-language surnames